Sweet and Twenty is a 1919 British silent romance film directed by Sidney Morgan and starring Marguerite Blanche, Langhorn Burton and George Keene.

Cast
 Marguerite Blanche as Jean Trevellyn  
 Langhorn Burton as Douglas Floyd 
 George Keene as Eustace Floyd  
 Arthur Lennard as Reverend James Floyd  
 George Bellamy as Prynne 
 Nell Emerald as Ellen

References

Bibliography
 Low, Rachael. The History of the British Film 1918-1929. George Allen & Unwin, 1971.

External links
 

1919 films
British romance films
British silent feature films
Films directed by Sidney Morgan
1910s romance films
British films based on plays
British black-and-white films
1910s English-language films
1910s British films